The American Lighthouse Foundation (ALF) is a 501(c)(3) non-profit organization founded in 1994 with a primary mission of lighthouse preservation.  ALF's main office and storefront are headquartered in Rockland, Maine, and the organization currently has thirteen chapters that have stewardship responsibility over the following twenty-two lighthouses in Connecticut, Maine, Massachusetts, New Hampshire, and Rhode Island:

References

External links 
 American Lighthouse Foundation website

Lighthouses in the United States
Lighthouse organizations